The  superyacht Icon was launched by ICON Yachts at their yard in Harlingen. The interior design of Icon was done by Studio Linse and the exterior work was done by Redman Whiteley Dixon. She has two sister ships, the 2013 built Party Girl and the 2013 built Baton Rouge.

She is available as a charter yacht.

Design 
She was built as a  yacht, but was lengthened in 2014. The hull is built out of steel while the superstructure is made out of aluminium with teak laid decks. The yacht is Lloyd's registered, issued by Cayman Islands.

Engines 
She is powered by twin diesel MTU 12V4000M71 engines.

See also
 List of motor yachts by length
 ICON Yachts
 MY Baton Rouge
 MY Party Girl

References

2009 ships
Motor yachts
Ships built in the Netherlands